The Yeşilçam Award was the national film award of Turkey, which was presented annually by the Turkish Foundation of Cinema and Audiovisual Culture (TÜRSAK) and Beyoğlu Municipality from 2008 to 2011. The award, which had been named after Yeşilçam Street in the Beyoğlu district of Istanbul where many film studios were based during the 1950s-1970s, was discontinued following the announcement by the Alliance of Cinema Labor Unions' Yeşilçam Film Academy (YEFA) intention to start issuing their own Yeşilçam Academy Award in protest against TÜRSAK's disregard of their suggestions to give the awards a more professional structure.

Awards

Best Film Award
 2008: Bliss directed by Abdullah Oğuz
 2009: Three Monkeys directed by Nuri Bilge Ceylan
 2010: Breath directed by Levent Semerci
 2011: Majority directed by Seren Yüce

Best Director Award
 2008: Fatih Akın for The Edge of Heaven
 2009: Nuri Bilge Ceylan for Three Monkeys
 2010: Reha Erdem for My Only Sunshine
 2011: Seren Yüce for Majority

Best Actor Award
 2008: Şener Şen for For Love and Honor
 2009: Onur Saylak for Autumn
 2010: Mert Fırat for Love in Another Language
 2011: Cem Yılmaz for Hunting Season

Best Actress Award
 2008: Özgü Namal for Bliss
 2009: Hatice Aslan for Three Monkeys
 2010: Binnur Kaya for Vavien
 2011: Demet Akbağ for Eyyvah Eyvah

Best Supporting Actor Award
 2008: Tuncel Kurtiz for The Edge of Heaven
 2009: Altan Erkekli for O... Çocukları
 2010: Cemal Toktaş for I Saw the Sun
 2011: Okan Yalabık for Hunting Season

Best Supporting Actress Award
 2008: Nursel Köse for The Edge of Heaven
 2009: Yıldız Kültür for Alone
 2010: Derya Alabora for Pandora's Box
 2011: Melisa Sözen for Hunting Season

Best Cinematography Award
 2008: Mirsad Heroviç for Bliss
 2009: Gökhan Tiryaki for Three Monkeys
 2010: Soykut Turan for I Saw the Sun
 2011: Uğur İçbak for Hunting Season

Best Screenplay Award
 2008: Fatih Akın for The Edge of Heaven
 2009: Ebru Ceylan, Nuri Bilge Ceylan & Ercan Kesal for Three Monkeys
 2010: Engin Günaydın for Vavien
 2011: Seren Yüce for Majority

Best Music Award
 2008: Zülfü Livaneli for Bliss
 2009: Aria Müzik for Alone
 2010: Attila Özdemiroğlu for Vavien
 2011: Selim Demirdelen for The Crossing

Digiturk  Young Talent Award
 2008: Saadet Işıl Aksoy for Egg
 2009: Ahmet Rıfat Şungar for Three Monkeys
 2010: Elit İşcan for My Only Sunshine
 2011: Esme Madra for Majority

Turkcell First Film Award
 2008: The White Angel directed by Mahsun Kırmızıgül
 2009: Autumn directed by Özcan Alper
 2010: Breath directed by Levent Semerci
 2011: Majority directed by Seren Yüce

Special Achievement Award
 2010: Filiz Akın

See also
 Yeşilçam Academy Award

References

External links
  for the awards (Turkish)

 
Awards established in 2008
2008 establishments in Turkey